Erki Nool (born 25 June 1970, in Võru, Estonia) is an Estonian decathlete and former politician.

Life and career
Nool grew up in an impoverished environment in the southern part of Võru. His father was a worker in a furniture factory and his mother was in charge of the finances of a school. There were six children, with Erki the third youngest. When he was 13, from the suggestion of his father he moved to a sports-focused boarding school. There he could eat a warm meal three times a day for free.

In those days the economy was in a poor condition. When traveling to competitions they didn't even get their own cabin in the cruise ship but instead just slept in the hallways and then competed and trained the next day. They also didn't even have winter athletics training facilities. Nool was brought to tears when he was gifted a new, pristine pair of sneakers. Getting to eat yogurt every morning was also new and memorable.

After Estonia became independent on 20 August 1991, Nool was vocal about his dream of competing in the Olympics as part of the Estonian team. He took part in the Barcelona 1992 Summer Olympics decathlon but he ended up having to stop and pull out. Little by little he developed and by the mid-1990s he was among the top athletes in decathlon. In September 1997 he established the first private athletics school in Estonia.

When he won gold for decathlon at the 1998 Budapest European Championships, he became a sports hero. Two years later, when he won the gold medal for decathlon in the 2000 Summer Olympics in Sydney, he became a national hero. Although Nool did not place first in any individual event, his total score was the highest. Nool won the title after the competition referee decided to over-rule a discus judge, who had red-flagged his last and only valid attempt due to alleged step-out. The reinstatement of his 43.66-metre third throw sparked unsuccessful counter-protests from other teams. Nool took gold ahead of the Czech Roman Šebrle and American Chris Huffins.

He has been voted as Estonia's sexiest man and in the 2000s the most popular Estonian. In 2006, Nool participated as a celebrity contestant on the first season of Tantsud tähtedega, an Estonian version of Dancing with the Stars. His professional dancing partner was Ave Vardja.

2005–2017, Erki Nool was the Vice Chairman of the EOC Athletes Commission and 2007–2011 member of the European Athletics Development Committee. 2008–2012, he was also member of the executive committee of the Estonian Olympic Committee.

On 4 March 2007, Nool was elected to the Estonian Parliament, the Riigikogu, representing the Union of Pro Patria and Res Publica. He has since left politics and now focuses on his real estate business and athletics school, with 450 students.

His son Robin Nool (born in 1998) is pole vaulter with a record of 5.40 m.

Achievements

References

External links

 
 

1970 births
Living people
People from Võru
Sportspeople from Võru
Estonian decathletes
Estonian sportsperson-politicians
Olympic athletes of Estonia
Olympic gold medalists for Estonia
Athletes (track and field) at the 1992 Summer Olympics
Athletes (track and field) at the 1996 Summer Olympics
Athletes (track and field) at the 2000 Summer Olympics
Athletes (track and field) at the 2004 Summer Olympics
Isamaa politicians
World Athletics Championships medalists
European Athletics Championships medalists
Medalists at the 2000 Summer Olympics
Olympic gold medalists in athletics (track and field)
21st-century Estonian politicians
World Athletics Championships athletes for Estonia
Goodwill Games medalists in athletics
Members of the Riigikogu, 2007–2011
Members of the Riigikogu, 2011–2015
Competitors at the 2001 Goodwill Games